Bonaventura Cerronio (fl. 1639) was an Italian composer. Little is known of his life.

References

Italian Baroque composers
17th-century Italian composers
Italian male classical composers
17th-century male musicians